Verbeek is a surname of Dutch origin. The name is a contraction of the toponym Van der Beek, meaning "from/of the creek". Besides a location near a stream, the original bearer may have been from a place called Beek. People with this surname include:
 Alexandra Verbeek (born 1973), Dutch competitive sailor
 Danny Verbeek (born 1990), Dutch football winger
 Dirk Verbeek, South African Army general, Chief of Staff Intelligence 1994
  (born 1958), Dutch journalist and editor
 Frans Verbeek (1510–1570), Flemish painter and draughtsman (usually spelled "Verbeeck")
 Esther Verbeek (1931–2018),  Flemish television presenter known as Aunt Terry
 Gertjan Verbeek (born 1962), Dutch football defender and manager
 Grace Verbeek (born 1958), Canadian middle-distance runner
 Guido Verbeck (1830–1898) (born "Verbeek"), Dutch political advisor, educator, and missionary in Japan
 Gustave Verbeek (or Verbeck) (1867–1937), Dutch-American illustrator and newspaper cartoonist, son of Guido.
  (1873–1954), German architect and city planner
  (1936–2013), Dutch priest and politician
 Leen Verbeek (born 1955), Dutch entrepreneur and Labour Party politician
 Lotte Verbeek (born 1982), Dutch actress, dancer and model
 Nicolaes Verbeek (1582–1637), Dutch brewer in Haarlem portrayed by Frans Hals
 Pat Verbeek (born 1964), Canadian-born US ice hockey player
 Peter-Paul Verbeek (born 1970), Dutch philosopher
 Pieter Adriaensz Verbeek (1575–1637), Dutch mayor of Haarlem portrayed by Frans Hals
 Pim Verbeek (1956–2019), Dutch football manager, coach of the Australia national team
 Rick Verbeek (born 1988), Dutch football midfielder
 Robert Verbeek (born 1961), Dutch football manager
 Rogier Verbeek (1845–1926), Dutch geologist and nature scientist
 Sem Verbeek (born 1994), Dutch tennis player
 Simon Verbeek (born 1967), Australian rules footballer
 Tonya Verbeek (born 1977), Canadian freestyle wrestler

See also
Van Beek
Van der Beek
Vanderbeek
Verbeeck
Verbeke

References

Dutch-language surnames
Toponymic surnames